Kodunsky Stanok (Khudanai Ürtöö) is a rural locality (an ulus) in Kizhinginsky District, Republic of Buryatia, Russia. The population was 168 as of 2010. There are 3 streets.

Geography 
Kodunsky Stanok is located 26 km northwest of Kizhinga (the district's administrative centre) by road. Ust-Orot is the nearest rural locality.

References 

Rural localities in Kizhinginsky District